My Last Day may refer to:

"My Last Day" (Scrubs episode), the 2002 last episode of the first season of Scrubs
My Last Day (film), a 2011 anime short by Studio 4°C about Jesus Christ
 My Last Day (album), a 2007 album by Kim Hiorthøy